Hashemabad (also Romanized as Hāshemābād; also known as Qal‘eh Now) is a village in Dehqanan Rural District, in the Central District of Kharameh County, Fars Province, Iran. At the 2006 census, its population was 148, in 36 families.

References 

Populated places in Kharameh County